Marguerite Reuche (13 November 1900 – 18 January 1978) was a French fencer. She competed in the individual women's foil competition at the 1928 and 1936 Summer Olympics.

References

External links
 

1900 births
1978 deaths
French female foil fencers
Olympic fencers of France
Fencers at the 1928 Summer Olympics
Fencers at the 1936 Summer Olympics
20th-century French women